Stomopteryx remissella is a moth of the family Gelechiidae. It was described by Philipp Christoph Zeller in 1847. It is found in most of Europe (except Ireland, Great Britain, the Benelux, Norway, Finland, the Baltic region and Ukraine).

The wingspan is 9–11 mm. Adults are on wing from June to July.

References

Moths described in 1847
Stomopteryx